James Brown Plays the Real Thing is the sixteenth studio album by American musician James Brown. The album was released in June 1967, by Smash Records.

Track listing

References

1967 albums
James Brown albums
Albums produced by James Brown
Smash Records albums